Bison Film Company, also known as 101 Bison Film Company, is an American film studio established in 1909 and disestablished in 1917.

It partnered with Miller Brothers 101 Ranch to lease 20,000 acres to build a Western town set and an Indian village and make silent films with stars including Tom Mix, Buck Jones, Hoot Gibson and Will Rogers. It produced The Indian Massacre (1912), by Thomas H. Ince.

In 1912 it also produced The Indian Raiders, Early Days in the West, Hunted Down, A Daughter of the Redskins, The Cowboy Guardians, The Tribal Law, An Indian Outcast; in 1913 it produced In Love and War, Woman and War; and in 1915 Lone Larry, starring Kingsley Benedict.

Filmography

1909

 Disinherited Son's Loyalty, directed by Fred J. Balshofer - short film
 Romance of a Fishermaid, directed by Fred J. Balshofer and Charles K. French - short film
 Davy Crockett - In Hearts United, directed by Fred J. Balshofer - short film
 The Squaw's Revenge, directed by Fred J. Balshofer - short film
 Why Mr. Jones Was Arrested, directed by Fred J. Balshofer - short film
A Terrible Attempt, directed by Fred J. Balshofer
A Cowboy's Narrow Escape, directed by Fred J. Balshofer
The True Heart of an Indian, directed by Fred J. Balshofer and Charles Inslee
The Blacksmith's Wife, directed by Fred J. Balshofer
I Love My Wife, But Oh, You Kid, directed by Fred J. Balshofer
The Gypsy Artist, directed by Fred J. Balshofer
My Wife's Gone to the Country, directed by Fred J. Balshofer
Sailor's Child, directed by Fred J. Balshofer
The Yiddisher Cowboy, directed by Fred J. Balshofer
Sheltered Under Stars and Stripes, directed by Fred J. Balshofer
Half Breed's Treachery, directed by Fred J. Balshofer
Secret Service Woman, directed by Fred J. Balshofer
His Two Children, directed by Fred J. Balshofer
The Paymaster, directed by Fred J. Balshofer
A Kentucky Planter, directed by Fred J. Balshofer
A Squaw's Sacrifice, directed by Fred J. Balshofer
The Faithful Wife, directed by Fred J. Balshofer
Dove Eye's Gratitude, directed by Fred J. Balshofer
The Gold Seeker's Daughter, directed by Fred J. Balshofer
Iona, the White Squaw, directed by Fred J. Balshofer
The Mexican's Crime, directed by Fred J. Balshofer
Young Deer's Bravery, directed by Fred J. Balshofer
The Ranchman's Wife, directed by Fred J. Balshofer
An Indian's Bride, directed by Fred J. Balshofer
The Parson's Prayer, directed by Fred J. Balshofer
Dooley's Thanksgiving Turkey, directed by Fred J. Balshofer
The Message of an Arrow, directed by Fred J. Balshofer
Reunited at the Gallows, directed by Fred J. Balshofer
The Love of a Savage, directed by Fred J. Balshofer
An Italian Love Story, directed by Fred J. Balshofer
The Red Cross Heroine, directed by Fred J. Balshofer

1910

 Red Girl's Romance, directed by Fred J. Balshofer - short film
 A Redman's Devotion, directed by Fred J. Balshofer - short film
 A Forester's Sweetheart, directed by Fred J. Balshofer - short film
 A Cowboy's Reward, directed by Fred J. Balshofer - short film
 Romany Rob's Revenge, directed by Fred J. Balshofer - short film
 The Mexican's Jealousy''', directed by Fred J. Balshofer - short film
 A Romance of the Prairie, directed by Fred J. Balshofer - short film
 His Imaginary Crime, directed by Fred J. Balshofer - short film
 The Female Bandit, directed by Fred J. Balshofer - short film
 By His Own Hands, directed by Fred J. Balshofer - short film
 The Ten of Spades; or, A Western Raffle, directed by Fred J. Balshofer - short film
 Young Deer's Gratitude, directed by Fred J. Balshofer - short film
 Government Rations, directed by Fred J. Balshofer - short film
 The Imposter, directed by Fred J. Balshofer - short film
 Dooley's Holiday, directed by Fred J. Balshofer - short film
 For Her Father's Honor, directed by Fred J. Balshofer - short film
 Dooley Referees the Big Fight, directed by Fred J. Balshofer - short film
 The Cowboy and the Schoolmarm, directed by Fred J. Balshofer - short film
 The New Partners, directed by Fred J. Balshofer - short film
 The Indian and the Cowgirl, directed by Fred J. Balshofer - short film
 The Rose of the Ranch, directed by Fred J. Balshofer - short film
 For His Sister's Honor, directed by Fred J. Balshofer - short film
 The Mexican's Ward', directed by Fred J. Balshofer - short film
 The Man from Texas, directed by Fred J. Balshofer - short film
 Company D to the Rescue, directed by Fred J. Balshofer - short film
 Nannina, directed by Fred J. Balshofer - short film
 A Shot in Time, directed by Fred J. Balshofer - short film
 Romance of a Snake Charmer, directed by Fred J. Balshofer - short film
 Red Wing's Loyalty, directed by Fred J. Balshofer - short film
 Rivalry in the Oil Fields, directed by Fred J. Balshofer - short film
 Red Wing's Constancy, directed by Fred J. Balshofer - short film
 A Husband's Mistake, directed by Fred J. Balshofer - short film
 The Adventures of a Cowpuncher, directed by Fred J. Balshofer - short film
 Rattlesnakes, directed by Fred J. Balshofer - short film
 Hazel, the Heart Breaker, directed by Fred J. Balshofer - short film                         
 The Rescue of the Pioneer's Daughter, directed by Fred J. Balshofer - short film
 A Sister's Devotion, directed by Fred J. Balshofer - short film
 Love and Money, directed by Fred J. Balshofer - short filmCupid's ComedyLost for Many Years The Feud, directed by Fred J. Balshofer - short film
 The Curse of Gambling, directed by Fred J. Balshofer - short film
 Perils of the Plains, directed by Fred J. Balshofer - short film
 The Tie That Binds, directed by Fred J. Balshofer - short film
 Married on Horseback, directed by Fred J. Balshofer - short film                                
 Girls, directed by Fred J. Balshofer - short film
 Saved from the Redmen, directed by Fred J. Balshofer - short filmAn Engineer's Sweetheart, directed by Fred J. Balshofer - short filmA Cowboy's Race for a WifeThe Sea Wolves, directed by Fred J. Balshofer - short filmA Mexican LotharioHer Terrible PerilA Ranchman's Simple SonA Sinner's SacrificeThe Sheriff of Black Gulch                                   A Mexican Love AffairRed Fern and the KidA Message of the SeaBlack Pete's ReformationLove in MexicoIn the Wild West, directed by Fred J. Balshofer - short filmA Miner's SweetheartA Cowboy's GenerosityA True Country HeartThe Prairie Post Mistress                                           A Woman's Better NatureThe Redmen's PersecutionThe Mascot of Company D Kit Carson, directed by Fred J. Balshofer - short film
 Dan, the Arizona Scout, directed by Fred J. Balshofer - short film
 The Night Rustlers, directed by Fred J. Balshofer - short filmWestern Justice, Fred J. Balshofer - short film
 A True Indian Brave, directed by Fred J. Balshofer - short film
 A Cowboy's Matrimonial Tangle, directed by Fred J. Balshofer - short film
 For a Western Girl, directed by Fred J. Balshofer - short film            
 For the Love of Red Wing, directed by Fred J. Balshofer - short filmA Cattle Rustler's DaughterA Cowboy for LoveThe Ranch RaidersYoung Deer's ReturnThe Girl ScoutA Cowboy's Daring RescueThe Prayer of a Miner's ChildThe Lure of GoldThe Wrong Trail          
 The Girl Cowboy, directed by Fred J. Balshofer - short film
 A Red Girl's Friendship, directed by Fred J. Balshofer - short film
 The Fatal Gold Nugget, directed by Fred J. Balshofer - short film
 Red Wing and the White Girl, directed by Fred J. Balshofer - short film
 The Branded Man, directed by Fred J. Balshofer - short film
 Bud's Triumph, directed by Fred J. Balshofer - short film
 The Flight of Red Wing, directed by Fred J. Balshofer - short film
 An Indian Maiden's Choice, directed by Fred J. Balshofer - short film
 True Western Honor, directed by Fred J. Balshofer - short film
 A Cheyenne's Love for a Sioux, directed by Fred J. Balshofer - short film 
 The Ranchman's Personal, directed by Fred J. Balshofer - short filmA Child of the WildA Sioux's RewardA Brave Western GirlAn Indian's TestA Girl of the PlainsThe Cattle Baron's DaughterThe Pale Faced Princess An Indian's Elopement, directed by Fred J. Balshofer - short filmTaming the Terror                                           

1911In the Heart of the SierrasThe Savage Girl's Devotion, directed by Fred J. Balshofer - short filmAn Indian Trapper's PrizeThe Creek ClaimTexas Ted's DefenseThe Redskin's SecretThe Red Man's WrathTrials of Bud BrownA Tough TenderfootA Squaw's BraveryThe Salted MineA Deputy's HonorA Warrior's SquawThe Way of a Red ManFate of Joe DorrA Warrior's FaithOwanee's Great LoveDick Farrell's PrizeHer PrisonerStarlight the SquawSacrifice of Silver CloudWas He Justified?The Cowboy's WaifAn Indian Nemesis - short filmThe Red AvengerAt Bar C RanchAvery's DreamIndian's MistakeA Man of HonorReturn of Company 'D'A Cowboy for a DayAn Indian's AmbitionA Red Man's GratitudeShifty's ClaimThe Knight of the TrailCrow's DefeatThe Foreman's Bride The Broncho Buster's Rival - short filmThe Cheyenne Medicine ManThe Outlaw and the Female DetectiveBrave Swift Eagle's PerilA Redskin's BraveryA Tale of the FoothillsHis Lordship's Hunting TripA Child of the RanchoA Squaw's RetributionThe Desert's LureThe Dude CowboyThe Foreman's MineAn Indian's LoveCowboy's VacationThe Unloaded GunBlacksnake's TreacheryA Red Girl's HeartGenerous CowboysHer CaptiveA Cheyenne's CourtshipSilver Wing's DreamThe Tables TurnedA True-Hearted MinerDarkfeather, the SquawGrey Cloud's DevotionThe New CowboyA Sioux SpyAn Indian Love Story, directed by Fred J. BalshoferA Cowboy's LoyaltyPioneer DaysAn Indian LegendThe Sheriff's LoveLittle Dove's RomanceThe Lost LetterLone Star's ReturnThe Sheriff's Brother - short film The Missionary's GratitudeLucky BobWhite Fawn's PerilThe Red Man's PenaltyRange JusticeThe Indian RustlersThe Pioneer's MistakeA Western BrideA Warrior's TreacheryA Noble Red ManAn Indian HeroThe Cattlemen's WarA Young Squaw's BraveryA Race for a BrideWenoma's Broken PromiseThe Winning of WonegaThe Ranchman's Mother-in-LawThe Broken TrapWhite Fawn's EscapeA Bad ManA Western One-Night StandAn Easterner's PerilThe Empty TepeeA Range RomanceBar Z's New CookThe Foreman's CourageCowgirls' PranksAn Indian MartyrFalsely Accused, directed by Thomas H. Ince - short filmGetting His Man, directed by Thomas H. Ince - short film

1912

 A Mexican Tragedy, directed by Thomas H. Ince - short film
 Chinese Smugglers, directed by Thomas H. Ince - short film
 The Indian Maid's Elopement, directed by Thomas H. Ince - short film
 The Gambler's Heart, directed by Thomas H. Ince - short film
 The Laugh on Dad, directed by Thomas H. Ince - short film
 The Honor of the Tribe, directed by Thomas H. Ince - short film
 The Run on the Bank, directed by Thomas H. Ince - short film
 The Sub-Chief's Choice, directed by Thomas H. Ince - short film
 The Ranch Girl's Love, directed by Thomas H. Ince - short film
 Love and Jealousy, directed by Thomas H. Ince - short filmThe Empty Water Keg, directed by Thomas H. InceThe Protection of the CrossA Tenderfoot's RevengeBroncho Bill's Love AffairThe Wild West CircusThe Deputy's Sweetheart, directed by Thomas H. InceWar on the Plains, directed by Thomas H. Ince - short filmThe Heart of an IndianThe Battle of the Red MenThe Deserter, directed by Thomas H. InceThe Crisis, directed by Thomas H. InceBlazing the Trail, directed by Thomas H. InceThe Post Telegrapher, directed by Thomas H. Ince and Francis Ford - short filmThe Lieutenant's Last FightThe Outcast, directed by Thomas H. InceMemories of a PioneerA Soldier's HonorHis PunishmentOn the Warpath, directed by Reginald BarkerHis Message, directed by Thomas H. InceThe Colonel's PerilThe Sheriff of Stoney ButteThe Restoration, directed by Fred J. BalshoferReconciledJust in TimeThe Sheriff's Mysterious AideDaredevil Dick Wins a WifeThe Little RancherThe White SaviorAn Even BreakHis Partner's ShareA Western Girl's DreamHer First ChoiceThe Widow's ClaimThe Shot That FailedHow He Made GoodFor Love, Life and Riches, directed by Frank MontgomeryA Shot in the Dark, directed by Ben F. WilsonThe Arizona Land SwindleHer Last ResortA White IndianThe Girl from Golden RunThe Ranchman's AwakeningThe Massacre of Santa Fe Trail, directed by Frank E. MontgomeryThe Sheriff's RewardAt Old Fort Dearborn; or, Chicago in 1812A Western EpisodeWhen Uncle Sam Was YoungThe Indian Raiders, directed by Tom RickettsThe TattooStar Eyes' Stratagem, directed by Frank E. MontgomeryEarly Days in the WestHunted DownA Daughter of the RedskinsThe Cowboy GuardiansTrapper Bill, King of ScoutsA Red Man's Love Frank E. MontgomeryAn Indian IshmaelA Blackfoot ConspiracyThe Tribal Law, directed by Wallace Reid and Otis TurnerTrapped by FireThe Half-Breed ScoutAn Indian OutcastThe Massacre of the Fourth CavalryBig Rock's Last StandThe Rights of a SavageA Four-Footed HeroA Ride for LifeBefore the White Man CameIndian Dances and PastimesHeroine of the PlainsEl Capitan and the Land GrabbersThe Redemption of White Hawk1913A Girl at War The Romance of the Utah Pioneers, directed by Charles Farley - short filmAn Apache Father's Vengeance, directed by Frank MontgomeryA Frontier Providence, directed by Otis TurnerRegimental PalsThe Genius of Fort LapawaiA Gambler's Last Trick Sheridan's Ride, directed by Otis Turner - short filmCowboy Sports and PastimesMona of the Modocs, directed by Frank MontgomeryA Frontier MysteryOn the FrontierIn the Redman's CountryThe Song of the Telegraph, directed by Frank Montgomery
 The Bugler of Company B - short film
 The Coward's Atonement, directed by Francis Ford - short filmThe Red Girl's Sacrifice, directed by Frank MontgomeryHis Brother, directed by Francis FordAt Mad Mole CanyonThe Flaming ArrowIndian BloodThe Battle of Bull Run, directed by Francis FordThe Return of Thunder Cloud's Spirit, directed by Henry MacRaeThe Light in the Window, directed by Francis FordThe Half Breed Parson, directed by Francis FordA House DividedTaps, directed by Francis FordBedford's HopeThe Darling of the Regiment, directed by Francis FordWar, directed by Francis FordBred in the Bone, directed by Wilfred LucasThe Last Roll CallThe Vengeance of the Skystone, directed by Henry MacRaeThe Indian's SecretThe Northern SpyThe Toll of War, directed by Francis FordIn the Secret Service, directed by Henry MacRaeThe Stars and Stripes Forever, directed by Francis FordUnder FireLove, Life and Liberty, directed by Henry MacRaeThe Honor of the Regiment, directed by Wilfred Lucas
 The Battle of San Juan Hill, directed by Francis Ford - short film
 The Spirit of the Flag, directed by Allan Dwan - short film
 The Grand Old Flag, directed by Henry MacRae - short film
 The Capture of Aguinaldo, directed by Francis Ford - short film
 In Love and War, directed by Allan Dwan and Thomas H. Ince - short film
 Women and War, directed by Allan Dwan - short filmThe Guerilla Menace The Battle of Manila, directed by Francis Ford - short film
 At Shiloh - short film
 The Powder Flash of Death, directed by Allan Dwan - short film
 The Head Hunters - short film
 The Picket Guard, directed by Allan Dwan - short filmWhen Sherman Marched to the Sea, directed by Jack ConwayThe LawbreakersRobinson Crusoe, directed by Otis TurnerThe Cave Dwellers' Romance The Death Stone of India, directed by Milton J. Fahrney - short filmThe Snake, directed by Frank MontgomeryCampaigning with CusterSoldiers ThreeThe Iron Trail, directed by Henry MacRaeThe Mystery of Yellow Aster Mine, directed by Frank BorzageThe Gratitude of Wanda, directed by Wallace ReidPelleas and Melisande, directed by J. Farrell MacDonaldThe Love of Men, directed by Frank MontgomeryA Forest Romance, directed by Frank MontgomeryWandering Folk, directed by Otis TurnerIn the Coils of the Python, directed by Henry MacRaeThrough the WindowThe Struggle, directed by Jack Conway and Frank MontgomeryCaptain Billie's Mate, directed by Francis FordShon the Piper, directed by Otis TurnerGood-for-Nothing JackThe Girl and the Tiger, directed by Henry MacRaeFighters of the PlainsIn the Wilds of AfricaThrough Barriers of Fire, directed by Edwin AugustThe She Wolf, directed by Francis FordThe Cowboy MagnateThe Black Masks, directed by Grace Cunard and Francis FordFrom Dawn Till Dark, directed by Francis FordCaptain Kidd, directed by Otis TurnerThe Prairie TrailThe Madonna of the Slums, directed by Francis FordLascaThe Raid of the Human TigersWynona's Vengeance, directed by Francis FordThe White Vaquero, directed by Francis FordWar of the Cattle Range, directed by Henry MacRae
 The White Squaw, directed by Henry MacRae - short film
 The Werewolf, directed by Henry MacRae - short filmThe God of GirzahThe Water War, directed by Henry MacRae

1914The Gambler's OathThe Eleventh Hour, directed by Henry MacRae (1914)The Flash of Fate, directed by Henry MacRae (1914)For the Freedom of CubaThe Mad Hermit, directed by Francis Ford (1914)The Vagabond SoldierUnjustly AccusedHer Father's GuiltThe Legion of the Phantom TribeThe Yaqui's RevengeFrom the Lion's JawsIn the Wolves' FangsTwo Little WaifsThe Lamb, the Woman, the WolfDangers of the VeldtDolores D'Arada, Lady of SorrowOld CaliforniaThe Tragedy of Whispering CreekA Nation's Peril (1914)The Hills of SilenceThe Triumph of Mind, directed by Lois Weber (1914)Cast Adrift in the South SeasOn the Verge of WarIsle of Abandoned HopeThe Forbidden Room, directed by Allan Dwan (1914)The Old CobblerThe Hopes of Blind AlleyProwlers of the WildA Mexican Spy in AmericaOlana of the South SeasTribal War in the South SeasRescued by Wireless, directed by Henry MacRae - short film (1914)The Oubliette, directed by Charles Giblyn - short film (1914)The Lure of the GeishaThe Law of the LumberjackThe Return of the Twins' DoubleOur Enemy's SpyThe Higher Law, directed by Charles Giblyn - short film (1914)Richelieu, directed by Allan Dwan - mediometraggio (1914)Love and BaseballThe Phantom LightMonsieur BluebeardThe Mysterious HandA Redskin ReckoningA Daughter of the RedskinsThe Jungle MasterThe Silent PerilNinety Black BoxesThe Brand of His TribeThe Foundlings of Father TimeThe Trail BreakersThe Christmas Spirit, directed by Murdock MacQuarrie (1914)The Law of the Range, directed by Henry MacRae (1914)

1915In the Jungle WildsCuster's Last ScoutThe Governor Maker, directed by Henry MacRae (1915)Old Peg Leg's WillThe Mystery WomanRidgeway of MontanaTerrors of the Jungle, directed by Henry MacRae (1915)Tre briganti e una ragazzaThe Curse of the DesertThe Lost LedgeDiana of Eagle MountainThe Mother Instinct, directed by Wilfred Lucas (1915)La città nascosta (The Hidden City), directed by Francis Ford (1915)The Oaklawn HandicapBetty and the BoysAnd They Called Him HeroLa porta della distruzioneThe War of the WildNabbedThe Blood of His BrotherThe Jungle QueenThe Smuggler's LassThe Circus Girl's RomanceOne Man's EvilLone LarryThe Test of a ManJane's Declaration of IndependenceThe Ulster LassThe Toll of the Sea, directed by Henry MacRae - short film (1915)The Mad Maid of the ForestA Daughter of the JunglesGene of the NorthlandChasing the LimitedThe GopherThe Social LionCoralIn the Sunset CountryThe SurrenderA Message for HelpThe Ghost WagonThe Queen of Jungle LandThe Yellow StarA Fight to a FinishThe Superior ClaimThe Mettle of Jerry McGuireWhat the River ForetoldThe Heart of a TigressA Desperate LeapThe Connecting LinkThe Lion's WardHis Real CharacterWhen Rogues Fall Out, directed by J.P. McGowan

1916The Dawn RoadOn the Trail of the TigressAcross the Rio Grande, directed by George Marshall (1916)Buck Simmons, PuncherA Daughter of PenanceThe Phantom IslandHis Majesty Dick TurpinA Recoiling VengeanceStampede in the NightThe One Woman, directed by Henry Otto (1916)The Quarter BreedThe Iron RivalsBehind the Curtain, directed by Henry Otto (1916)The Night RidersBehind the Mask, directed by Francis Ford (1916)The Rival PilotsThe Passing of Hell's CrownThe Torrent of VengeanceThe LeapA Fight for LoveHulda the SilentThe Wedding Guest, directed by Jacques Jaccard - short film (1916)Tammany's TigerThe Cage ManA Railroad BanditThe Ghost of the JungleThe Money LendersThe Committee on CredentialsThe Human PendulumMidwinter MadnessFor the Love of a Girl, directed by Harry Carey (1916)Under the Lion's PawA Jungle Hero Along the Malibu, directed by Cleo Madison and William V. Mong - short film (1916)
 Beyond the Trail, directed by Ben F. Wilson - short film (1916)
 The Trail of Chance, directed by Lucius Henderson - short film (1916)
 The Desert Rat, directed by Romaine Fielding - short film (1916)The Princely Bandit A Mountain Tragedy, directed by George Cochrane - short film (1916)Night ShadowsThe ConspiracyThe Better Man, directed by Jay Hunt (1916)For Love and GoldThe Quitter, directed by Burton George - short film (1916)The Son of a Rebel ChiefThe Lost LodeThe Telegraph Operator's DaughterThe Greater PowerThe Good WomanThe Taint of FearFighting JoeGiant Powder1917Blood Money, directed by Fred Kelsey - short film (1917)The Bad Man of Cheyenne, directed by Fred Kelsey (1917)Brute Force, directed by A.W. Rice (1917)The Daring Chance, directed by William V. Mong (1917)The Boonton Affair, directed by King Baggot (1917)The Outlaw and the Lady, directed by Fred Kelsey - short film (1917)John Osborne's Triumph, directed by Murdock MacQuarrie (1917)The Comeback, directed by George Marshall (1917)
 Il tornado (The Tornado), directed by John Ford - short film (1917)The Drifter, directed by Fred Kelsey (1917)Roped In, directed by George Marshall (1917)Goin' StraightSteel HeartsBurning SilenceBurning SilenceThe Kidnapped Bride, directed by Henry MacRae (1917)The Tell Tale ClueLa pista dell'odioThe Little MoccasinsOne Wild Night, directed by Henry MacRae (1917)Casey's Border RaidDropped from the Clouds, directed by Henry MacRae (1917)Number 10, WestboundL'attaccabrighe (The Scrapper), directed by John Ford - short film (1917)The Honor of MenMoney and MysteryThe Wrong Man, directed by Fred KelseyDouble SuspicionIl pastore di anime (The Soul Herder), directed by John Ford - short film (1917)Squaring ItJungle TreacheryThe Lure of the Circus, directed by William B. Pearson (1917)The Texas SphinxThe Last of the Night RidersThe Dynamite SpecialThe Lion's LairSaving the Fast MailThe Temple of TerrorThe Getaway, directed by George Cochrane (1917)Danger Ahead''

References

Bibliography
 

1909 establishments in California
1917 disestablishments in California
American companies established in 1909
American companies disestablished in 1917
Mass media companies established in 1909
Mass media companies disestablished in 1917
Defunct American film studios
Silent film studios
History of film
Companies based in Los Angeles